Maryinka is a rural locality (a village) in Penkinskoye Rural Settlement, Kameshkovsky District, Vladimir Oblast, Russia. The population was 22 as of 2010.

Geography 
Maryinka is located 63 km south of Kameshkovo (the district's administrative centre) by road. Pirogovo is the nearest rural locality.

References 

Rural localities in Kameshkovsky District